Sport Lisboa e Benfica, commonly known as Benfica, is a semi-professional athletics team based in Lisbon, Portugal. Founded in December 1906, it is the senior representative side of the athletics section of multi-sports club S.L. Benfica. They compete in men's and women's domestic and international competitions.

Current men's roster

Current women's roster

Men's titles

Domestic competitions
 Portuguese Outdoor Men's Athletics Championship
 Winners (34): 1939, 1940, 1942, 1944, 1949, 1951, 1953, 1954, 1955, 1967, 1980, 1982, 1983, 1984, 1986, 1989, 1990, 1991, 1992, 1993, 1994, 1996, 2011, 2012, 2013, 2014, 2015, 2016, 2017, 2018, 2019, 2020, 2021, 2022

 Portuguese Indoor Men's Athletics Championship
 Winners (11): 1994, 1995, 2012, 2013, 2014, 2015, 2016, 2018, 2019, 2020, 2022

 Portuguese Cross Country Men's Championship
 Winners (24): 1913, 1932, 1933, 1934, 1936, 1937, 1944, 1945, 1946, 1947, 1954, 1955, 1956, 1957, 1958, 1964, 1975, 1981, 1990, 2013, 2014, 2015, 2021, 2022

Portuguese Cross Country Men's mid-race Championship
 Winners (9) – record: 2013, 2014, 2015, 2016, 2017, 2018, 2020, 2022, 2023

 Portuguese Road Men's Championship
 Winners (7): 1991, 2013, 2014, 2015, 2016, 2017, 2020

European competitions
 European Road Champion Clubs Cup
 Winners (5): 1988, 1989, 1990, 1991, 1992

Women's titles

Domestic competitions
 Portuguese Outdoor Women's Athletics Championship
 Winners (14): 1977, 1978, 1982, 1983, 1984, 1985, 1986, 1988, 1989, 1990, 1991, 1992, 1993, 1994

 Portuguese Indoor Women's Athletics Championship
 Winners: 1994

 Portuguese Cross Country Women's Championship
 Winners (8): 1967, 1968, 1969, 1970, 1971, 1990, 2015, 2016

 Portuguese Road Women's Championship
 Winners (4): 1990, 2014, 2015, 2016

References

External links
  

Athletics
Sport in Lisbon
Athletics (track and field) clubs
1906 establishments in Portugal